The Dornier Do 22 was a German seaplane, developed in the 1930s. Despite good performance, it was built only in small numbers and entirely for the export market. The type was operated in the Second World War by Finland, Greece and Yugoslavia.

Development and design
In 1934, Dornier's Swiss subsidiary, based at its factory at Altenrhein, designed a three-seat, single-engined military floatplane, the Do C3; two prototypes were built, with the first flown in 1935.

It was a parasol wing monoplane of fabric-covered all-metal construction. Its slightly swept back wing was attached to the fuselage by bracing struts, and its two floats were braced to both the wing and fuselage. It was powered by a Hispano-Suiza 12Ybrs engine driving a three-bladed propeller, and could carry a single torpedo or bombs under the fuselage. Defensive armament was one fixed forward-firing machine gun, also two in the rear cockpit and one in a ventral tunnel.

The first production model, known as the Do 22/See when fitted with floats, did not fly until 15 July 1938 from Dornier's factory at Friedrichshafen, Germany, although it did incorporate parts made in Switzerland. While the Luftwaffe was not interested in the aircraft, examples were sold to Yugoslavia, Greece and Latvia. In March 1939, a prototype with conventional landing gear (the Do 22L), was completed and test-flown, but it did not enter production.

Operational history
The Greek Do 22s were destroyed during the German invasion of the Balkans in 1941, but the crews of eight of the Yugoslav machines successfully evaded capture or destruction by fleeing to Egypt. There they flew under the control of the British Royal Air Force until the lack of spare parts made the aircraft unusable.

The four Latvian aircraft had not been delivered when the Soviet Union occupied Latvia in 1940, and were retained by Germany. In 1942 they were transferred to Finland, being used on floats or skis until the end of the war.

Variants
Do C3
Prototypes of the Do 22, two built
Do 22Kg
 Export version for Greece.
Do 22Kj
 Export version for Yugoslavia.
Do 22Kl
 Export version for Latvia. Not delivered, but eventually transferred to Finland.
Do 22L
 Land-based aircraft, fitted with a conventional landing gear. One prototype only.

Operators
 Finnish Air Force – four Do 22KI 

Royal Hellenic Air Force
 
Latvian Air Force 
 Yugoslav Royal Navy  – 12

Specifications (Do 22)

See also

Notes

References

Donald, David (ed.) The Encyclopedia of World Aircraft. Leicester, UK: Blitz Editions. .
Green, William. War Planes of the Second World War: Volume Six Floatplanes. London:Macdonald, 1962.

March, Daniel J. British Warplanes of World War II. London:Aerospace Publishing, 1998. .

Smith, J.R. and Kay, Antony L. German Aircraft of the Second World War. London:Putnam, 1972. .

External links

 A history of military equipment of Modern Greece (1821 - today): Greek Do.22 Kg

Do 022
1930s German bomber aircraft
World War II aircraft of Finland
Aircraft first flown in 1938
Single-engined tractor aircraft
Parasol-wing aircraft
Floatplanes